Stolac is a town and municipality in Bosnia and Herzegovina, located in Herzegovina. 

Stolac may also refer to:
 Stolac (Bugojno), a village in Bosnia and Herzegovina
 Stolac (Gacko), a village in Bosnia and Herzegovina
 Stolac (Višegrad), a village in Bosnia and Herzegovina